Alice Downs Station is a pastoral lease that operates as a cattle station in Western Australia.  it is one of four stations known as the Springvale Aggregation, owned by Harvest Road.

History
The property was established prior to 1901; the manager that year was F. G. Taylor. The area had been struck by ticks at the same time, though Alice Downs had not been largely affected.

The owners of the property, Yates, Taylor and Cranwell, placed the  property on the market in 1908, at which time it was stocked with 1,800 head of shorthorn cattle.
 
Frank Taylor retained possession of Alice Downs but with a new partner, H. F. Parnell, who was also known as C. H. Newman. The pair placed both Alice Downs and Panton Hills Station on the market in 1919.

In March 2022, Andrew Forrest's agribusiness, Harvest Road, bought the station, along with Springvale Station, Mabel Downs, and Texas Downs, together known as the Springvale Aggregation. Together they cover  and are stocked with 35,000 head of cattle. Traditional owners of the land were keen to work with the new owners, hoping for some of the land to be developed as tourist destinations, which would create jobs for Indigenous people in a region which has few opportunities. In addition, with Forrest's known interest in improving the lives of Indigenous peoples, it is hoped that his wealth could be used to improve educational outcomes for children in the Halls Creek area.

Description
A portion of the Panton River flows through the property, along with many of its tributaries such as Eales Creek and Wild Dog Creek. Stock can also be watered at numerous springs. The area consists of open downs covered with Mitchell, Flinders and bundle grasses.

See also
List of ranches and stations
List of pastoral leases in Western Australia

References

Homesteads in Western Australia
Pastoral leases in Western Australia
Stations (Australian agriculture)
Kimberley (Western Australia)